Michelau may refer to the following places:

Michelau in Oberfranken, in the district of Lichtenfels, Bavaria, Germany
Michelau im Steigerwald, in the district of Schweinfurt, Bavaria, Germany
Michelau, Luxembourg, part of Bourscheid
Michałów, Opole Voivodeship
Michale, Kuyavian-Pomeranian Voivodeship